The 1999 Major League Soccer Supplemental Draft took place in Fort Lauderdale on the afternoon of Sunday, February 7. The second and third rounds of the 1999 MLS College Draft had taken place earlier that morning.  In this supplemental draft, a number of teams passed in the second and third rounds.  Consequently in 2000, MLS merged the college and supplemental draft into the 2000 MLS SuperDraft.

Round 1

Round 1 trades

Round 2

Round 2 trades

Round 3

Round 3 trades

Unresolved 1999 Supplemental Draft trades
4 February 1998: D.C. United traded Raul Diaz Arce and third round pick in 1999 college draft to New England Revolution for first round pick in 1999 supplemental draft, and first round and second round picks in 1999 college draft.

External links
 1999 MLS drafts

References

Major League Soccer drafts
Supplemental Draft
MLS Supplemental Draft
Soccer in Florida
Sports in Fort Lauderdale, Florida
Events in Fort Lauderdale, Florida
MLS Supplemental Draft